Tongo Hamed Doumbia  (born 6 August 1989) is a Malian professional footballer who plays as a midfielder for Western United and the Mali national team.

Career

French football
Doumbia played youth football with Olympique Noisy-le-Sec, JS Noisy-le-Sec, FC Les Lilas and RSC Montreuil. Aged 17 he signed a contract with Ligue 2 club LB Châteauroux in summer 2007. He played for their reserve team of Châteauroux in the French Fifth Division, playing just one first team game for the club; on 20 February 2009 against Guingamp.

After two years with Châteauroux Doumbia left to sign for Rennes on 19 June 2009. He made his debut for team in the Coupe de la Ligue against FC Sochaux on 23 September 2009. During the 2010–11 and 2011–12 seasons he became a more regular player in the Rennes line-up, making a total of 59 appearances for the club to date.

Wolves
On 30 July 2012, Doumbia initially joined English side Wolverhampton Wanderers on a planned season-long loan deal, with view to a permanent move. On 13 November 2012, Wolves announced that Doumbia had signed a permanent contract to keep him at the club until summer 2016. He made 35 appearances in total during the season as the club ended up becoming relegated to League One.

After this relegation, new Wolves manager Kenny Jackett stated that Doumbia was not likely to feature in his plans for the new season. On 6 August 2013 he left Wolves to join Ligue 1 club Valenciennes on a season-long loan, where he became a regular player but could not help them avoid relegation.

Toulouse
On 29 August 2014, Doumbia signed for Ligue 1 club Toulouse for an undisclosed fee.

Al Ain FC
Doumbia signed for Al Ain FC in Abu Dhabi on 5 October 2018.

Aktobe
On 18 February 2021, Doumbia signed for Kazakhstan Premier League club FC Aktobe.

References

External links

Tongo Hamed Doumbia profile at StadeRennais.com

1989 births
Living people
French people of Malian descent
People from Vernon, Eure
Association football midfielders
French footballers
Citizens of Mali through descent
Malian footballers
Mali international footballers
Olympique Noisy-le-Sec players
Stade Rennais F.C. players
LB Châteauroux players
Wolverhampton Wanderers F.C. players
Valenciennes FC players
Toulouse FC players
GNK Dinamo Zagreb players
Al Ain FC players
Ajman Club players
Western United FC players
Ligue 2 players
Ligue 1 players
English Football League players
Croatian Football League players
UAE Pro League players
Expatriate footballers in England
Malian expatriate footballers
2015 Africa Cup of Nations players
Expatriate footballers in the United Arab Emirates
Sportspeople from Eure
Footballers from Normandy